KSXC-LD, virtual channel 5 (UHF digital channel 26), is a low-powered Daystar-affiliated television station licensed to Sioux City, Iowa, United States. The station is owned by Venture Technologies Group.

Digital channel

External links

SXC-LD
Television channels and stations established in 2006
2006 establishments in Nebraska
Low-power television stations in the United States